Dmitry Valeryevich Zhitnikov (born 20 November 1989) is a Russian handball player for Wisła Płock and the Russian national team.

References

External links

1989 births
Living people
Russian male handball players
Sportspeople from Zvolen
Expatriate handball players in Poland
Russian expatriate sportspeople in Hungary
Russian expatriate sportspeople in Poland
Wisła Płock (handball) players
SC Pick Szeged players